The 1982–83 Ohio Bobcats men's basketball team represented Ohio University as a member of the Mid-American Conference in the college basketball season of 1982–83. The team was coached by Danny Nee in his third season at Ohio. They played their home games at Convocation Center. The Bobcats finished with a record of 23–9 and second in the MAC regular season with a conference record of 12–6.  They won the MAC tournament with wins over Eastern Michigan, Toledo, and MAC regular season champion Bowling Green.  John Devereaux was named the tournament MVP. They received a bid to the NCAA tournament. There they defeated Illinois State before losing to Kentucky in the second round. 23 wins was the school record at the time.

Schedule

|-
!colspan=9 style=| Regular Season

|-
!colspan=9 style=| MAC Tournament

|-
!colspan=9 style=| NCAA Tournament

Source:

Statistics

Team Statistics
Final 1982–83 Statistics

Source

Player statistics

Source

References

Ohio Bobcats men's basketball seasons
Ohio
Ohio
Ohio Bobcats men's basketball
Ohio Bobcats men's basketball